David Swallow (born 19 November 1992) is an Australian rules footballer playing for the Gold Coast Suns in the Australian Football League (AFL). Swallow won the Gold Coast Suns Club Champion award in 2014, becoming the second player to win the award after Gary Ablett Jr. won the award in the club's first three seasons, and served as Gold Coast co-captain from 2019 to 2021. He received a nomination for the 2011 AFL Rising Star award in round 14 of the 2011 season.

Early life
Swallow was born in Perth, Western Australia to a Dutch mother and an English father. His older brother, Andrew, is a former captain of the North Melbourne Football Club and a dual Syd Barker Medallist. He attended Shelley Primary School and Rossmoyne Senior High School, and played his junior football at Rossmoyne Junior Football Club. Swallow was named on the half-back line of the 2009 Under-18 All Australian team as a 16-year-old, and was awarded the Larke Medal as the Under-18 competition's best player.

In 2010, despite not yet being drafted by an AFL team, Swallow was permitted to play in 's Victorian Football League (VFL) team prior to the club's inaugural season in 2011. This meant that if Gold Coast wanted to draft Swallow, the club had to select him with one of the first three picks in the 2010 AFL draft. However, it was widely assumed that Swallow would be taken with the first pick in the draft, which was confirmed on 19 November.

AFL career
Swallow was part of the inaugural Gold Coast Suns team which played against  in round 2 of the 2011 AFL season. He was also part of the club's first victory against  in round 5.

In 2014, Swallow won the Gold Coast Suns Club Champion award, becoming the second player after Gary Ablett Jr. to win the award.

In November 2018, Swallow signed a five-year contract extension with the Suns, tying him to the club until the end of 2024.

In February 2019, Swallow was named as Gold Coast co-captain, alongside Jarrod Witts.

Swallow was suspended for one match for striking 's Justin Westhoff following Gold Coast's loss to the Power in round 1 of the 2020 season.

In February 2022, Swallow stepped down from the Suns' co-captaincy, with Touk Miller named in his place.

Statistics
Statistics are correct to the end of round 3, 2022

|- style=background:#EAEAEA
| scope=row | 2011 ||  || 24
| 21 || 11 || 14 || 208 || 205 || 413 || 62 || 84 || 0.5 || 0.7 || 9.9 || 9.8 || 19.7 || 3.0 || 4.0 || 2
|-
| scope=row | 2012 ||  || 24
| 12 || 8 || 2 || 130 || 96 || 226 || 31 || 43 || 0.7 || 0.2 || 10.8 || 8.0 || 18.8 || 2.6 || 3.6 || 1
|- style=background:#EAEAEA
| scope=row | 2013 ||  || 24
| 18 || 3 || 2 || 195 || 152 || 347 || 47 || 61 || 0.2 || 0.1 || 10.8 || 8.4 || 19.3 || 2.6 || 3.4 || 1
|-
| scope=row | 2014 ||  || 24
| 22 || 15 || 20 || 287 || 226 || 513 || 67 || 118 || 0.7 || 0.9 || 13.0 || 10.2 || 23.3 || 3.0 || 5.4 || 5
|- style=background:#EAEAEA
| scope=row | 2015 ||  || 24
| 6 || 2 || 2 || 70 || 46 || 116 || 16 || 35 || 0.3 || 0.3 || 11.7 || 7.7 || 19.3 || 2.7 || 5.8 || 0
|-
| scope=row | 2016 ||  || 24
| 0 || — || — || — || — || — || — || — || — || — || — || — || — || — || — || 0
|- style=background:#EAEAEA
| scope=row | 2017 ||  || 24
| 18 || 11 || 8 || 213 || 177 || 390 || 49 || 91 || 0.6 || 0.4 || 11.8 || 9.8 || 21.7 || 2.7 || 5.1 || 0
|-
| scope=row | 2018 ||  || 24
| 20 || 11 || 11 || 243 || 198 || 441 || 73 || 91 || 0.6 || 0.6 || 12.2 || 9.9 || 22.1 || 3.7 || 4.6 || 2
|- style=background:#EAEAEA
| scope=row | 2019 ||  || 24
| 22 || 13 || 7 || 282 || 227 || 509 || 87 || 84 || 0.6 || 0.3 || 12.8 || 10.3 || 23.1 || 4.0 || 3.8 || 7
|-
| scope=row | 2020 ||  || 24
| 15 || 4 || 10 || 154 || 116 || 270 || 54 || 59 || 0.3 || 0.7 || 10.3 || 7.7 || 18.0 || 3.6 || 3.9 || 2
|- style=background:#EAEAEA
| scope=row | 2021 ||  || 24
| 21 || 6 || 7 || 258 || 202 || 460 || 106 || 99 || 0.3 || 0.3 || 12.3 || 9.6 || 21.9 || 5.0 || 4.7 || 0
|-
| scope=row | 2022 ||  || 24
| 3 || 0 || 1 || 28 || 18 || 46 || 10 || 5 || 0.0 || 0.3 || 9.3 || 6.0 || 15.3 || 3.3 || 1.7 || TBA
|- class=sortbottom
! colspan=3 | Career
! 178 !! 78 !! 77 !! 2068 !! 1663 !! 3731 !! 602 !! 770 !! 0.4 !! 0.4 !! 11.6 !! 9.3 !! 21.0 !! 3.4 !! 4.3 !! 20
|}

Notes

Honours and achievements
Individual
 Gold Coast co-captain: 2019–2021
 Gold Coast Suns Club Champion: 2014
 22under22 team: 2014
 AFL Rising Star nominee: 2011

References

External links

 
 

1992 births
Living people
East Fremantle Football Club players
Australian people of Dutch descent
Australian people of English descent
Gold Coast Football Club players
Australian rules footballers from Western Australia
Gold Coast Suns Club Champion winners